Hannes Miettinen (25 September 1893 – 2 January 1968) was a Finnish athlete. He competed in the men's individual cross country event at the 1920 Summer Olympics.

References

External links
 

1893 births
1968 deaths
Athletes (track and field) at the 1920 Summer Olympics
Finnish male long-distance runners
Olympic athletes of Finland
Athletes from Helsinki
Olympic cross country runners